Mercers Creek Bay (formerly Belfast Bay) is a large bay in the northeast of Antigua. The settlements of Willikies and Seaton's lie close to the bay, which is protected from the Atlantic Ocean by a string of small islands, the largest of which is Crump Island.

References

External links

Bays of Antigua and Barbuda
Saint Philip Parish, Antigua and Barbuda